Cape Wrath Trail is a hiking route that runs through the Scottish Highlands and along the west coast of Scotland.

It is approximately 200 miles (321 km) in length and is considered to be one of the most challenging long distance walks in the UK.  Despite not being an officially recognised National Trail it has grown to be one of the most highly regarded backpacking routes, attracting hikers from around the world.

The trek was pioneered in the early 1990s by David Paterson who, in 1996, published a book entitled The Cape Wrath Trail: A New 200-mile Walking Route Through the North-west Scottish Highlands. This was followed in 1999 by a separate publication (North to the Cape: A trek from Fort William to Cape Wrath) by Denis Brook and Phil Hinchliffe.

In both versions the trail begins in Fort William and ends at Cape Wrath lighthouse on the northwest tip of the Scottish mainland. It connects with the West Highland Way, North Highland Way and part of an alternative route suggested by Cameron McNeish which follows the Great Glen Way out of Fort William before joining the main route in Glen Shiel.

A new, updated guidebook to the Cape Wrath Trail was published by Cicerone Press in May 2013. 

These guidebooks estimate an experienced walker should be able to traverse the entire route in less than 20 days. However the authors detail slightly different routes and stages for walkers to follow.  There are other alternatives on various segments of the route, thus there is yet to be an "official" established route. Many walkers see this variety as a quintessential part of the trail's appeal. The alternatives allow differing access to bothies, provisions, stream crossings and scenery.

Officially the trail is not endorsed by Scottish Natural Heritage and it is not waymarked or signposted. Facilities along the trail are also minimal and it covers some of the remotest parts of mainland Britain.

The Fastest Known Time (FKT) for the Cape Wrath Trail (following Iain Harper's Cicerone guidebook route) is four days, nine hours and 43 minutes, set by ultra runner Beth Pascall and Damian Hall (self-supported) in December 2018.

Locations on route 
 Cape Wrath
 Dundonnell
 Durness
 Fort William
 Inchnadamph
 Inverie
 Kinlochewe
 Morar
 Rhiconich
 Shiel Bridge
 Strathcarron
 Ullapool

Geographic features on route 
 Beinne Eighe (Mountain and National Nature Reserve)
 Eas a' Chual Aluinn (Waterfall)
 Knoydart (Peninsula)
 Loch Duich
 Falls of Glomach (Waterfall)
 Sandwood Bay
 Torridon (Mountain range)
 An Teallach (Mountain)

See also 
Caledonian Canal
Cape Wrath
Long Distance Routes

References 

  Description on a website dedicated to the trail
  Entry for new guidebook on Cicerone's website

Further reading 
 Harper, Iain: Cicerone, 2013  The Cape Wrath Trail Guide
 Paterson, David: Peak Publishing, 1996 The Cape Wrath Trail: A New 200-mile Walking Route Through the North-west Scottish Highlands

External links 

 Cape Wrath Trail Guide - website for new guide book
 Cape Wrath Trail in Winter - expedition blog with useful info
 Ramblers Association website description
 Cape Wrath Trail - An Expedition Report
 Cape Wrath Trail - Another Expedition Report
 Cape Wrath Trail - Climate Charts
 Cape Wrath Trail - a detailed trip report with logistical information
 Cape Wrath Trail (Walkhighlands) - An interactive map

Long-distance footpaths in Scotland
Footpaths in Highland (council area)